Jason Hedlesky (born February 20, 1974) is an American former race car driver. He is now a spotter for Matt Crafton in the NASCAR Gander Outdoors Truck Series.

Career 
Hedlesky has competed in select ARCA Re/Max races from 2000 to 2007, with the exception of 2004. Hedlesky's previous ARCA starts came behind the wheel of cars fielded by legendary team owner, Junie Donlavey.

Hedlesky was the General Manager of Donlavey Racing in the Winston Cup Series from 1998 to 2004, the year Donlavey decided to retire from active competition. At the 2002 UAW-GM Quality 500 at Lowe's Motor Speedway, he was the last person to qualify Donlavey's legendary #90 Lucas Oil Ford, starting 41st and finishing 43rd after 31 laps for his only Cup start.

Hedlesky's last competitive race was in 2007 in the ARCA Series.

After his driving career, Hedlesky became a spotter in NASCAR, first working with Carl Edwards' No. 99 team for Roush Fenway Racing. He initially started spotting part time while continuing to race in ARCA, when the two series' schedules did not conflict with each other. Eventually, he also started spotting for Matt Crafton's No. 88 team for ThorSport Racing in the Truck Series. In 2015, when Edwards left Roush for the new 4th Joe Gibbs Racing car, the No. 19, Hedlesky moved over with him.

In 2017, Hedlesky became the spotter for Cup Series driver Matt Kenseth. He was swapped with Kenseth's previous spotter Chris Osborne after the surprise retirement of Edwards and the promotion of Daniel Suarez to the 19 car in the Monster Energy Cup Series. The duo of Osborne and Suarez had previously worked together in the Xfinity Series, winning the 2016 championship.

Hedlesky lost his job with JGR after Erik Jones and his spotter Rick Carelli moved over together from Furniture Row Racing to the No. 20 car for Gibbs, replacing Kenseth and Hedlesky. However, he continues to spot in the Truck Series for Crafton and ThorSport Racing. He also later started spotting for DGR-Crosley when the team was formed in 2018.

Motorsports career results

NASCAR
(key) (Bold – Pole position awarded by qualifying time. Italics – Pole position earned by points standings or practice time. * – Most laps led.)

Winston Cup Series

Busch Series

Craftsman Truck Series

ARCA Re/Max Series
(key) (Bold – Pole position awarded by qualifying time. Italics – Pole position earned by points standings or practice time. * – Most laps led.)

References

External links
 
 Jason Hedlesky Racing News
 Roush Fenway Racing Team Roster

1974 births
Living people
NASCAR drivers
ARCA Menards Series drivers
Racing drivers from Detroit
Racing drivers from Michigan